Les Aires is a commune in the Hérault department in the Occitanie region in southern France.

Geography

Climate
Les Aires has a mediterranean climate (Köppen climate classification Csa).

Sights

 Ruins of the château of Mourcairol.
 The castle chapel of Saint-Michel.
 Part of the ancient road between Béziers and Cahors.

Population

See also
Communes of the Hérault department

References

Communes of Hérault